John Joseph Farrell (April 1, 1901 – June 14, 1988) was an American professional golfer, best known for winning the U.S. Open in 1928. Over the course of his career, he won 22 PGA Tour events. He was elected to the World Golf Hall of Fame in 2023 and will be inducted in 2024.

Early life
Born in White Plains, New York, Farrell started as a caddie and turned professional in 1922.

Golf career
At the 1928 U.S. Open, held at Olympia Fields Country Club near Chicago, Farrell tied with amateur Bobby Jones, then a two-time champion, after the regulation 72 holes and won the 36-hole playoff by one stroke. Farrell was voted the 1927 and 1928 Best Golf Professional in the United States, after a winning streak of six consecutive tournaments, on his road to a total of 22 career PGA Tour wins. He played for the United States in the first three Ryder Cups: 1927, 1929, and 1931.

Farrell was the head professional at the Quaker Ridge Golf Club in New York from 1919 to 1930. In 1931, Farrell played in his third Ryder Cup and also met and married Catherine Hush. In 1934, Farrell accepted the head professional job at Baltusrol Golf Club in Springfield, New Jersey.

Family
The Farrells had five children: Johnny, Jimmy, Billy, Peggy, and Cathy. The Farrell family dedicated itself to golf, becoming Golf Family of the Year in 1966. Billy Farrell played professional golf and is best known for being the first ever to hit the  par-5 17th hole at Baltusrol's Lower Course in two shots, which he did during the 1967 U.S. Open.

Death
Farrell died in Boynton Beach, Florida after a stroke at age 87.

Professional wins (27)

PGA Tour wins (22)
1921 (1) Garden City Open
1922 (1) Shawnee Open
1924 (1) Florida West Coast Open
1925 (2) Philadelphia Open Championship, Mid-South All Pro
1926 (4) Florida Central Competition, Florida Open, Shawnee Open, Mid-Winter Tournament
1927 (7) Metropolitan Open, Shawnee Open, Eastern Open Championship, Massachusetts Open, Pennsylvania Open Championship, Philadelphia Open Championship, Chicago Open Championship
1928 (2) La Gorce Open, U.S. Open
1930 (2) Pensacola Open Invitational, New York State Open
1931 (1) Pensacola Open Invitational
1936 (1) New Jersey Open

Major championship is shown in bold.

Other wins (5)
Note: This list may be incomplete.
1925 Miami International Four-Ball (with Bobby Cruickshank)
1926 Westchester Open
1928 Miami International Four-Ball (with Gene Sarazen)
1940 Rhode Island Open
1941 Rhode Island Open

Major championships

Wins (1)

1 Defeated Bobby Jones in a 36-hole playoff – Farrell 70-73=143 (+1), Jones 73-71=144 (+2).

Results timeline

NYF = tournament not yet founded
NT = no tournament
WD = withdrew
CUT = missed the half-way cut
R64, R32, R16, QF, SF = round in which player lost in PGA Championship match play
"T" indicates a tie for a place

Summary

Most consecutive cuts made – 18 (1919 PGA – 1928 U.S. Open)
Longest streak of top-10s – 6 (twice)

See also 
List of golfers with most PGA Tour wins

References

External links
Johnny Farrell website

American male golfers
PGA Tour golfers
Winners of men's major golf championships
Ryder Cup competitors for the United States
Golfers from New York (state)
Golfers from New Jersey
People from White Plains, New York
Sportspeople from Boynton Beach, Florida
1901 births
1988 deaths